The 1960 Stanley Cup playoffs began on March 23, after the regular season ended. It was the tournament to determine the 1960 Stanley Cup professional ice hockey championship of the National Hockey League (NHL)

The regular-season Montreal Canadiens' momentum did not stop as they played eight games, the minimum number to win the Stanley Cup. Montreal, in the process, became the last Cup winners in NHL history to go perfect in the playoffs to date. After winning the Stanley Cup, Maurice Richard retired from the NHL as a champion.

Playoff bracket

Semifinals 
Bobby Hull of the Chicago Black Hawks had led the league in scoring, but the well-oiled machine called the Montreal Canadiens managed to hold him to only six goals as the Canadiens swept the Black Hawks in four. The Toronto Maple Leafs, though, had a slightly tougher time against the Gordie Howe led Detroit Red Wings as it took the Leafs 6 games, including one in triple overtime, to win the series.

Chicago Black Hawks vs. Montreal Canadiens

Montreal wins best-of-seven series 4 games to 0

Detroit Red Wings vs. Toronto Maple Leafs

Toronto wins best-of-seven series 4 games to 2

Final
 see 1960 Stanley Cup Finals

Toronto Maple Leafs vs. Montreal Canadiens

Montreal wins best-of-seven series 4 games to 0

Leading scorers
Note: GP = Games played; G = Goals; A = Assists; Pts = Points

See also
 1959–60 NHL season
 1960 in sports

References
 
 
 
 
 

Notes

 

playoffs
Stanley Cup playoffs